Gemerek is a town and a district of Sivas Province of Turkey. The mayor is Mustafa Demir (BBP).

References

Populated places in Sivas Province
Districts of Sivas Province